Datuna is a name of Georgian origin, a diminutive of the name David. 

Datuna may refer to: 

 Datuna (village), a village in Dagestan, Russia 
 Datuna Church, 10th century Georgian church in Russia
As a given name:
David Rakviashvili, former Secretary of the National Security Council of Georgia
Prince David of Kakheti (c. 1612–1648), a prince of the Georgiam Kingdom of Kakheti

As a  surname:
David Datuna (born 1974), Georgian-American artist

Hypocorisms
Georgian-language surnames